The 2023–24 Pac-12 Conference men's basketball season began with practices in October followed by the 2023–24 NCAA Division I men's basketball season which started on November, 2023. Conference play will begin in December 2023. This will be the eleventh season under the Pac–12 Conference name and the 38th since the conference first sponsored women's sports, including basketball, in the 1986–87 school year.

The Pac-12 tournament will take place in March 2024 at the T-Mobile Arena in Paradise, Nevada.

Pre-season

Recruiting classes

Preseason watchlists
Below is a table of notable preseason watch lists.

Preseason All-American teams

Preseason polls

Pac-12 Media days
The Pac-12 will conduct its 2023 Pac-12 media days at the location to be named later in October, 2023 on the Pac-12 Network.

The teams and representatives in respective order were as follows:

 Pac-12 Commissioner – George Kliavkoff
 Deputy Commissioner and Chief Operating Officer(MBB) – Jamie Zaninovich
 Arizona – Tommy Lloyd (HC)
 Arizona State – Bobby Hurley (HC)
 California – Vacant (HC)
 Colorado – Tad Boyle (HC)
 Oregon – Dana Altman (HC)
 Oregon State – Wayne Tinkle (HC)
 Stanford – Jerod Haase (HC)
 UCLA – Mick Cronin (HC)
 USC – Andy Enfield (HC)
 Utah – Craig Smith (HC)
 Washington – Mike Hopkins (HC)
 Washington State – Kyle Smith (HC)

Source:

Pac-12 Preseason All-Conference

First Team

Second Team

Honorable Mention

Midseason watchlists
Below is a table of notable midseason watch lists.

Final watchlists
Below is a table of notable year end watch lists.

Regular season
The Schedule will be released in late October. Before the season, it was announced that for the seventh consecutive season, all regular season conference games and conference tournament games would be broadcast nationally by ESPN Inc. family of networks including ABC, ESPN, ESPN2 and ESPNU, FOX and FS1, CBS Sports, and the Pac-12 Network.

Early season tournaments

Records against other conferences
Records against non-conference foes for the 2023–24 season. Records shown for regular season only.

Regular Season

Postseason

Record against ranked non-conference opponents
This is a list of games against ranked opponents only (rankings from the AP Poll):

Pac-12/SWAC Legacy Series
On September 20, 2021, the Pac-12 and Southwestern Athletic Conference will debut the Pac-12/SWAC Legacy Series, an educational and basketball scheduling partnership between the two collegiate athletics conferences, to tip off the 2023–24 season.  The Legacy Series will incorporate an array of educational opportunities for competing teams and student-athletes featuring expert speakers and prominent alumni, community engagement, campus traditions, historic site visits, and book/film discussions.

Team rankings are reflective of AP poll when the game was played, not current or final ranking

Conference schedule
This table summarizes the head-to-head results between teams in conference play.

Points scored

Through

Rankings

*AP does not release post-NCAA Tournament rankings

Head coaches

Coaching changes

Coaches
Note: Stats shown are before the beginning of the season. Pac-12 records are from time at current school.

Notes:
† On March 9, 2023, Cal fired head coach Mark Fox.
 Pac-12 records, conference titles, etc. are from time at current school and are through the end the 2022–23 season.
 NCAA tournament appearances are from time at current school only.
 NCAA Final Fours and Championship include time at other schools.

Post season

Pac-12 tournament

The conference tournament will be played in March 6−9, 2024 at the T-Mobile Arena in Paradise, NV. The top four teams will have a bye on the first day. Teams will be seeded by conference record, with ties broken by record between the tied teams followed by record against the regular-season champion, if necessary.

All-Tournament Team

Most Outstanding Player

NCAA tournament

Four teams from the conference that will be selected to participate: Arizona, Arizona State, UCLA & USC.

National Invitation Tournament 
Three members from the conference that will be selected to participate: Colorado, Oregon & Washington State.

Awards and honors

Players of the Week 
Throughout the regular season, the Pac-12 offices will honor 2 players based on performance by naming them player of the week and freshman of the week.

Totals per School

All-Americans

AP Honorable Mention:

Sources:
*Associated Press All-America Team
*National Association of Basketball Coaches All-America Team
*Sporting News All-America Team
*USBWA All-America Team

All-District
The United States Basketball Writers Association (USBWA) named the following from the Pac-12 to their All-District Teams:

District VIII

All-District Team

District IX
Player of the Year

All-District Team

The National Association of Basketball Coaches (NABC) named the following from the Pac-12 to their All-District Teams:

District 19

Pac-12 season awards

All-Pac-12

 ‡ Pac-12 Player of the Year
 ††† three-time All-Pac-12 First Team honoree
 †† two-time All-Pac-12 First Team honoree

Honorable Mention

All-Freshman Team

‡ Pac-12 Freshman of the Year
Honorable Mention

All-Defensive Team

‡Pac-12 Defensive Player of the Year
†† two-time Pac-12 All-Defensive Team honoree
Honorable Mention

Scholar Athlete of the year
The Pac-12 moved to seasonal Academic Honor Rolls, discontinuing sport-by-sport teams, starting in 2019-20

2023–24 Season statistic leaders
Source:

2024 NBA draft

Home game attendance 

Bold – At or exceed capacity
†Season high

See also
2022–23 Pac-12 Conference women's basketball season

References

2022–23 Pac-12 Conference men's basketball season